East Cape is the easternmost point of the main islands of New Zealand. It is located at the northern end of the Gisborne District of New Zealand's North Island. It can also refer to the broader Gisborne cape.

East Cape was originally named "Cape East" by British explorer James Cook during his 1769–1779 voyage. It is one of four Cardinal Capes, alongside North Cape, West Cape and South Cape.

Maritime New Zealand operates the East Cape Lighthouse is located at the cape's easternmost point. The small East Island / Whangaokeno, also known as Motu o Kaiawa, is located directly offshore.

The New Zealand Transport Agency upgraded the Horoera Bridge in 2017, giving campervans and other heavy vehicles full access to the East Cape Lighthouse. It replaced a temporary Bailey bridge installed in 2015.

It is not to be confused with the East Cape / Koromere on Stewart Island / Rakiura.

Demographics

East Cape had a population of 1,389 at the 2018 New Zealand census, a decrease of 30 people (−2.1%) since the 2013 census, and a decrease of 174 people (−11.1%) since the 2006 census. There were 462 households, comprising 735 males and 654 females, giving a sex ratio of 1.12 males per female. The median age was 39.8 years (compared with 37.4 years nationally), with 360 people (25.9%) aged under 15 years, 213 (15.3%) aged 15 to 29, 603 (43.4%) aged 30 to 64, and 210 (15.1%) aged 65 or older.

Ethnicities were 22.7% European/Pākehā, 91.6% Māori, 2.2% Pacific peoples, 0.6% Asian, and 1.1% other ethnicities. People may identify with more than one ethnicity.

The percentage of people born overseas was 2.4, compared with 27.1% nationally.

Although some people chose not to answer the census's question about religious affiliation, 41.9% had no religion, 41.0% were Christian, 5.2% had Māori religious beliefs, 0.2% were Muslim, 0.2% were Buddhist and 0.6% had other religions.

Of those at least 15 years old, 105 (10.2%) people had a bachelor's or higher degree, and 294 (28.6%) people had no formal qualifications. The median income was $18,500, compared with $31,800 nationally. 48 people (4.7%) earned over $70,000 compared to 17.2% nationally. The employment status of those at least 15 was that 297 (28.9%) people were employed full-time, 171 (16.6%) were part-time, and 105 (10.2%) were unemployed.

References

Headlands of the Gisborne District